The Netherlands was represented by Corry Brokken, with the song '"Heel de wereld", at the 1958 Eurovision Song Contest, which took place on 12 March in Hilversum. "Heel de wereld" was chosen at the Dutch national final on 11 February. Brokken had taken part in both previous Eurovisions, and her victory in Frankfurt the previous year with "Net als toen" had brought the contest to the Netherlands for the first time.

Before Eurovision

Nationaal Songfestival 1958 
The national final took place at the AVRO TV studios in Hilversum (the same venue in which the Eurovision final took place), hosted by Tanja Koen. Eleven songs and six singers were involved, with all participants other than Anneke van der Graaf performing two songs.

The winning song was chosen by postcard voting; the full ranking of the songs is known, but information on votes received is only available for the top five songs.

At Eurovision 
On the night of the final Brokken performed second in the running order, following Italy and preceding France. At the close of voting "Heel de wereld" had received only 1 point (from Switzerland), placing the Netherlands joint last (with Luxembourg) of the 10 entries.

The Dutch entry was conducted at the contest by the musical director Dolf van der Linden.

Brokken thus became the only performer in Eurovision history ever to have finished both first and last; it was also the only year, until 2015, in which the host country ended the evening at the bottom of the scoreboard.

Voting 
Every country had a jury of ten people. Every jury member could give one point to his or her favourite song.

References

External links 
 Dutch Preselection 1958

1958
Countries in the Eurovision Song Contest 1958
Eurovision